Balvand Rai was a poet mystic and rebeck player in the court of Guru Arjan. He was a Muslim belonging to the Mirasi community who embraced Sikh thought during the time of Guru Arjan. His three hymns are included in Guru Granth Sahib in Ramkali measure at Amritsar. He co-composed this Ballad of Ramkali with his rebeck player  Bhai Satta Doom, which includes a total of six hymns. He is said to have died in Lahore during the time of Guru Hargobind (1595–1644) and was buried on the bank of the River Ravi.

See also 

 Bhai Mardana
 Rababi
 Sikh music

References

Sikh Bhagats